Aoplonema is a genus of plant bugs in the family Miridae.

Species
 Aoplonema nigrum Forero, 2008
 Aoplonema princeps (Uhler, 1894)
 Aoplonema rubrum Forero, 2008

References

Miridae genera
Orthotylini